Saleem Sarwar Jaura is a Pakistani politician who had been a member of the Provincial Assembly of the Punjab from August 2018 till January 2023. He is the son of former MPA, Muhammad Sarwar Jaura.

Political career

He was elected to the Provincial Assembly of the Punjab as a candidate of Pakistan Tehreek-e-Insaf from Constituency PP-31 (Gujrat-IV) in 2018 Pakistani general election. He contested the election as a joint candidate of Pakistan Tehreek-e-Insaf and Pakistan Muslim League (Q).  He serves as a syndicate member at the University of Gujrat. He also holds the position of Punjab assembly's parliamentary secretary for Social Welfare

References

Living people
Punjab MPAs 2018–2023
Pakistan Tehreek-e-Insaf MPAs (Punjab)
Year of birth missing (living people)